Caparra can refer to:
 Cáparra, the remains of a Roman city in Spain
 Caparra Archaeological Site, the remains of a Spanish colonial settlement in Puerto Rico
 Caparra Creek, New South Wales, Australia
 High Island (Queensland), Queensland, Australia